Rashindra Silva (born 11 November 1994) is a Sri Lankan cricketer. He made his first-class debut for Sri Lanka Air Force Sports Club in Tier B of the 2017–18 Premier League Tournament on 16 February 2018. He made his Twenty20 debut for Galle Cricket Club in the 2019–20 SLC Twenty20 Tournament on 4 January 2020.

References

External links
 

1994 births
Living people
Sri Lankan cricketers
Sri Lanka Air Force Sports Club cricketers
People from Panadura